Renato Traiola (19 December 1924 – 18 January 1988) was an Italian water polo player who competed in the 1952 Summer Olympics. He was born in Naples. In 1952 he was part of the Italian team which won the bronze medal in the Olympic tournament. He played one match as goalkeeper.

See also
 Italy men's Olympic water polo team records and statistics
 List of Olympic medalists in water polo (men)
 List of men's Olympic water polo tournament goalkeepers

External links
 

1924 births
1988 deaths
Italian male water polo players
Water polo goalkeepers
Water polo players at the 1952 Summer Olympics
Olympic bronze medalists for Italy in water polo
Medalists at the 1952 Summer Olympics
Water polo players from Naples